Paul Eusebius Mea Kaiuea (16 December 1939 – 24 June 2021) was a Kiribati Roman Catholic prelate, bishop of the Diocese of Tarawa and Nauru from 1978 to 2020. Mea was born in Gilbert and Ellice Islands and was ordained in 1969 a priest of the Missionaries of the Sacred Heart. Mea was then appointed the parish priest of North Tarawa. His work brought him to the attention of French Bishop Pierre Guichet. In 1978 he succeeded him as the bishop of the diocese when it encompassed all of Gilbert Islands soon independent Kiribati, Nauru, and Tuvalu. In 1982, Tuvalu was removed from the jurisdiction of the diocese. In 2020, he became  emeritus after resignation and was replaced by elected Koru Tito.

External links
Diocese of Tarawa and Nauru

1939 births
2021 deaths
People from the Gilbert Islands
I-Kiribati Roman Catholic bishops
20th-century Roman Catholic bishops in Oceania
21st-century Roman Catholic bishops in Oceania
I-Kiribati religious leaders
Roman Catholic bishops of Tarawa and Nauru